The Bridge of Sighs in Chester is a crossing that originally led from the Northgate gaol, across the Chester Canal, to a chapel in the Bluecoat School. It was built to allow condemned prisoners to receive the last rites before their execution without risk of escape.  It is recorded in the National Heritage List for England as a designated Grade II listed building.

History
The bridge was built probably in 1793. It originally had iron railings to prevent the prisoners from escaping. The railings were removed during World War II.  The architect was Joseph Turner.

After the Northgate Prison closed, Chester City Corporation tried to have the bridge removed in 1821.

See also

Grade II listed buildings in Chester (north and west)

References

Bridge of Sighs
Grade II listed buildings in Chester
Bridges in Cheshire
Joseph Turner (architect) buildings